Cristóbal de Aresti Martínez de Aguilar, O.S.B. (1578–1641) was a Catholic prelate who served as Bishop of Buenos Aires (1635–1641) and Bishop of Paraguay (1629–1635).

Biography
Cristóbal de Aresti Martínez de Aguilar was born in Valladolid, Spain in 1578 and ordained a priest in the Order of Saint Benedict on 10 October 1585.
On 12 February 1629, he was appointed during the papacy of Pope Urban VIII as Bishop of Paraguay.
On 3 December 1635, he was appointed during the papacy of Pope Urban VIII as Bishop of Buenos Aires.
He served as Bishop of Buenos Aires until his death in 1641.

References

External links and additional sources
 (for Chronology of Bishops) 
 (for Chronology of Bishops)  
 (for Chronology of Bishops) 
 (for Chronology of Bishops) 

17th-century Roman Catholic bishops in Argentina
Bishops appointed by Pope Urban VIII
1578 births
1641 deaths
Benedictine bishops
People from Valladolid
17th-century Roman Catholic bishops in Paraguay
Roman Catholic bishops of Paraguay
Roman Catholic bishops of Buenos Aires